Croatian Civic Party ( or HGS) is a right-wing political party in Croatia. It was established in September 2009 by Željko Kerum, an entrepreneur and mayor of Split after he won the mayoral elections as an independent candidate. During his mayoral campaign he often criticized political parties. Between 2009–2013 it was the ruling party in the city of Split in coalition with the far-right Croatian Pure Party of Rights (HČSP). 
For the 2011 elections the party formed a pre-election coalition with the Croatian Democratic Union for the two Dalmatian constituencies and won 2 seats in the parliament for himself and his sister Nevenka Bečić. In the parliamentary 2015 elections, the party won only 2234 votes in the two Dalmatian constituencies and became a non-parliamentary party

Electoral history

References

External links
 

2009 establishments in Croatia
Conservative parties in Croatia
Croatian nationalist parties
Nationalist parties in Croatia
Political parties established in 2009
Right-wing populism in Croatia
Right-wing populist parties